Grant County is a county in the U.S. state of North Dakota. As of the 2020 census, the population was 2,301. Its county seat is Carson.

History
The territory of Grant County was part of Morton County until 1916. On November 7 the county voters determined that the SW portion of the county would be partitioned off to form a new county, to be named after Ulysses S. Grant, the US President from 1869 to 1877. Accordingly, the county government was organized on November 28, with Carson as the seat. The county's boundaries have remained unchanged since its creation.

Geography

The Heart River flows eastward through the upper part of Grant County, and Cedar Creek flows east-northeastward along the county's southern boundary line. The county terrain consists of isolated hills among rolling hills, carved by drainages. The semi-arid ground is partially devoted to agriculture. The terrain slopes to the east and south; its highest point is a rise near its southwestern corner, at 2,680' (817m) ASL. Lake Tschida, a Bureau of Reclamation reservoir and recreation area on the Heart River, is the county's largest body of water.

The southwestern corner of North Dakota observes Mountain Time (Adams, Billings, Bowman, Golden Valley, Grant, Hettinger, Slope, and Stark counties). The counties of McKenzie, Dunn, and Sioux counties are split, with the western portions of each observing Mountain Time.

Major highways
  North Dakota Highway 21
  North Dakota Highway 31
  North Dakota Highway 49

Adjacent counties

 Morton County - northeast (observes Central Time)
 Sioux County - south
 Adams County - southwest
 Hettinger County - west
 Stark County - northwest

Protected areas

 Cedar River National Grassland (part)
 Heart Butte River State Game Management Area
 Otter Creek State Game Management Area
 Pretty Rock National Wildlife Refuge
 Sheep Creek Dam State Recreation Area

Lakes
 Pretty Rock Lake
 Sheep Creek Dam
 Lake Tschida

Demographics

2000 census
As of the 2000 census, there were 2,841 people, 1,195 households, and 800 families in the county. The population density was 2 people per square mile (1/km2). There were 1,722 housing units at an average density of 1.04 per square mile (0.40/km2). The racial makeup of the county was 96.90% White, 1.72% Native American, 0.35% Asian, 0.35% from other races, and 0.67% from two or more races. 0.60% of the population were Hispanic or Latino of any race. 73.7% were of German, 7.9% Norwegian and 5.2% American ancestry.

There were 1,195 households, out of which 25.10% had children under the age of 18 living with them, 60.80% were married couples living together, 3.80% had a female householder with no husband present, and 33.00% were non-families. 31.80% of all households were made up of individuals, and 17.90% had someone living alone who was 65 years of age or older. The average household size was 2.30 and the average family size was 2.90.

The county population contained 23.40% under the age of 18, 4.30% from 18 to 24, 20.50% from 25 to 44, 27.10% from 45 to 64, and 24.70% who were 65 years of age or older. The median age was 46 years. For every 100 females there were 104.10 males. For every 100 females age 18 and over, there were 100.30 males.

The median income for a household in the county was $23,165, and the median income for a family was $30,625. Males had a median income of $21,537 versus $17,949 for females. The per capita income for the county was $14,616.  About 14.70% of families and 20.30% of the population were below the poverty line, including 24.70% of those under age 18 and 20.90% of those age 65 or over.

2010 census
As of the 2010 census, there were 2,394 people, 1,128 households, and 694 families in the county. The racial makeup of the county was 97.2% white, 1.1% American Indian, 0.1% Asian, 0.2% from other races, and 1.3% from two or more races. Those of Hispanic or Latino origin made up 0.3% of the population. In terms of ancestry, 66.6% were German, 14.0% were Norwegian, 12.5% were Russian, 5.9% were Irish, 5.5% were English, and 2.2% were American.

Of the 1,128 households, 19.6% had children under the age of 18 living with them, 54.7% were married couples living together, 3.9% had a female householder with no husband present, 38.5% were non-families, and 36.5% of all households were made up of individuals. The average household size was 2.10 and the average family size was 2.72. The median age was 51.7 years.

The median income for a household in the county was $39,500 and the median income for a family was $53,542. Males had a median income of $33,750 versus $27,303 for females. The per capita income for the county was $25,840. About 7.3% of families and 13.0% of the population were below the poverty line, including 18.1% of those under age 18 and 18.7% of those age 65 or over.

Communities

Cities

 Carson (county seat)
 Elgin
 Leith
 New Leipzig

Census-designated places
 Heil
 Raleigh

Unincorporated communities

 Brisbane
 Dogtooth
 Freda
 Johnson Ford
 Lark
 Saint Gertrude
 Shields

Townships

 Elm
 Fisher
 Freda
 Howe
 Lark
 Leipzig
 Minnie
 Pretty Rock
 Raleigh
 Rock
 Winona

Defunct township
 Otter Creek Township

Politics
Grant County voters have traditionally voted Republican. In no national election since 1936 has the county selected the Democratic Party candidate.

See also
 National Register of Historic Places listings in Grant County, North Dakota

References

Further reading

External links
 Official website
 Grant County maps, Sheet 1 (northern) and Sheet 2 (southern), North Dakota DOT

 
1916 establishments in North Dakota
Populated places established in 1916